Louise Forestier (born Louise Belhumeur on August 10, 1942) is a Canadian singer, songwriter and actress.

Biography
Born in Shawinigan, Quebec, Canada, Forestier was trained in acting at the National Theatre School in Montreal, but it was as a singer that she first became known in 1966, when she received the Renée Claude Trophy from Le Patriote, a boîte à chansons in east-end Montreal, and was named Discovery of the Year on the Radio-Canada TV program Jeunesse Oblige.

In 1968 she was part of the extraordinarily successful revue L'Osstidcho, followed the next year by L'Osstidchomeurt with Robert Charlebois, Yvon Deschamps and Mouffe. She and Charlebois recorded the landmark song "Lindberg'" and toured France in 1969.

In April 1970 Forestier starred in the Michel Tremblay, François Dompierre musical, Demain matin Montréal m'attend. She continued with acting, appearing in Jacques Godbout's 1972 film IXE-13, singing on the original film score.

Forestier topped the Quebec charts in 1973 with a version of the folk song "La Prison de Londres", performed with guitarist Claude Lafrance, and pianist Jacques Perron. With this song Forestier started to turn away from the hard rock of her early career to a repertoire largely inspired by Quebec folk music, and to a more personal style, which she continued through the 1970s.

In 1980 Forestier played Marie-Jeanne, the robot waitress in the Montreal production Luc Plamondon, Michel Berger rock opera Starmania. Two years later, with Plamondon as producer, she staged the hit show Je suis au rendez-vous. This was the first of a series of shows in the 1980s, culminating in an appearance with Belgian singer Maurane as part of the Francofolies de Montréal in 1989.

In 1990 she appeared at the Place-des-Arts in Montreal as Émilie Nelligan, the mother of the poet in the romantic opera Nelligan by Michel Tremblay and André Gagnon.

Forestier defended Yann Martel's novel Histoire de Pi in the French version of Canada Reads, which was broadcast on Radio-Canada in 2004.

In March 2019, she was one of 11 singers from Quebec, alongside Ginette Reno, Diane Dufresne, Céline Dion, Isabelle Boulay, Luce Dufault, Laurence Jalbert, Catherine Major, Ariane Moffatt, Marie Denise Pelletier and Marie-Élaine Thibert, who participated in a supergroup recording of Renée Claude's 1971 single "Tu trouveras la paix" after Claude's diagnosis with Alzheimer's disease was announced.

Awards and recognition
 Winner of the Manteau d'Arlequin prize, 1976, awarded by the critics of France for the best presentation of a French song.
 Quebec woman of the year in the arts field, 1984
 SOCAN Lifetime Achievement Award, 2013
 Member of the Order of Canada, 2013

Discography
 1967 - La boulée
 1968 - Lindberg (with Robert Charlebois)
 1969 - La douce Emma
 1970 - Avec enzymes
 1970 - Demain matin, Montréal m'attend
 1972 - IXE-13
 1973 - Dans la prison de Londres
 1974 - Le reel à Ti-Guy
 1975 - Au théâtre Outremont, avec le cœur de tout nous autres
 1975 - Tour de chant
 1976 - On est bien mieux chez vous
 1978 - L'accroche-cœur
 1979 - Charlebois à la Forestier
 1983 - Prince-Arthur
 1987 - La passion selon Louise
 1991 - De bouche à oreille
 1993 - Vingt personnages en quête d'une chanteuse
 1993 - Québec love, la collection
 1997 - Forestier chante Louise
 2003 - Lumières
 2008 - Éphémère

Filmography

Film
IXE-13 - 1972
Orders (Les Ordres) - 1974
Little Tougas (Ti-Cul Tougas) - 1976
La Postière 
2 Seconds (2 secondes) - 1998

Television
 Le 101, ouest, avenue des Pins (1984)
 Paparazzi (1997)
 Réseaux (1998)

References

External links

1943 births
Living people
Canadian stage actresses
Canadian television actresses
Canadian film actresses
Canadian musical theatre actresses
People from Shawinigan
Singers from Quebec
French-language singers of Canada
French Quebecers
Actresses from Quebec
Members of the Order of Canada
Canadian women pop singers
20th-century Canadian women singers
21st-century Canadian women singers